Fox Theater, also known as  Central Assembly Central Christian Center, is a historic movie theater located at Joplin, Jasper County, Missouri.  It was built in 1930, and is a two-story, "L"-shaped, brick, single bay, two-part commercial building with Mission Revival detailing. The ornate interior features extensive displays of plaster, metal, and wood decoration executed in Spanish Revival designs. The building was sold to the Central Assembly Church of Joplin in 1974.

It was listed on the National Register of Historic Places in 1990.  It is located in the Joplin Downtown Historic District.

References

Individually listed contributing properties to historic districts on the National Register in Missouri
Theatres on the National Register of Historic Places in Missouri
Mission Revival architecture in Missouri
Theatres completed in 1930
Buildings and structures in Joplin, Missouri
National Register of Historic Places in Jasper County, Missouri